Atomic Energy Authority Act (with its variations) is a stock short title used for legislation in the United Kingdom relating to the United Kingdom Atomic Energy Authority.

The Bill for an Act with this short title will have been known as a Atomic Energy Authority Bill during its passage through Parliament.

List
The Atomic Energy Authority Act 1995 (c. 37)
The Atomic Energy Authority Act 1986 (c. 3)  
The Atomic Energy Authority (Special Constables) Act 1976 (c. 23) 
The Atomic Energy Authority (Weapons Group) Act 1973 (c. 4)
The Atomic Energy Authority Act 1971 (c. 11) 
The Atomic Energy Authority Act 1959 (c. 5) 
The Atomic Energy Authority Act 1954 (c. 32)

See also
 List of short titles
 Energy law

Lists of legislation by short title
Energy law